Josiah Abigail Patterson Campbell (March 2, 1830 – January 10, 1917) was an American politician and lawyer who served as the Chief Justice of the Supreme Court of Mississippi, and was previously a Speaker of the Mississippi House of Representatives and Deputy from Mississippi to the Provisional Congress of the Confederate States from 1861 to 1862.

Biography
Josiah Abigail Patterson Campbell was born in Lancaster District, South Carolina, the son of a Presbyterian minister and the daughter of a wealthy plantation owner. His family was of Scottish descent. He learned to read at four years old.

He was educated at Davidson College in North Carolina, thereafter moving to Madison County, Mississippi at the age of fifteen. He was admitted to the bar at Kosciusko, Mississippi on June 12, 1847, at the age of seventeen, making him the youngest lawyer in Mississippi, where he opened a law office and "conducted a large and profitable practice". He was elected to the state legislature in 1851 and 1859. He was the Speaker of the Mississippi House of Representatives from 1859 to 1860. He was a President pro tempore of the Provisional Congress of the Confederate States for two days in 1861 and again for one day in 1862, becoming one of the original signers of the Confederate Constitution, and attained the rank of Lieutenant colonel in the Confederate States Army during the American Civil War, serving in the Mississippi 40th Infantry Regiment, where he was slightly wounded at the Second Battle of Corinth. 

After the war, he was elected circuit judge for the Fifth Circuit and served until 1868, when he was forced out of office for not swearing allegiance to the United States. In 1870, he was one of the commissioners who framed the code of 1871, and in 1879, he similarly worked on the code of 1880. In 1876, he became one of the chief organizers of the Mississippi Plan, which ended the era of Republican rule in Mississippi. He was appointed to a seat on the Supreme Court of Mississippi vacated by the resignation of Jonathan Tarbell in 1876, and served as Chief Justice from 1891 to 1894. He became one of the drafters of the 1890 Mississippi Constitution, which enforced legal white supremacy. In 1895, he declined re-appointment, and returned to private practice. He was succeeded on the court by Albert H. Whitfield.

According to James Meredith, the first Black student at the University of Mississippi and his great-grandson, he was the "father of White supremacy in Mississippi", but also spent the last decades of his life with his Black family and was a supporter of Black enfranchisement. Campbell was a supporter of legal equality of court testimony between races. 

Campbell died on January 10, 1917, in Canton, Mississippi, and lay in state at the Mississippi Capitol Rotunda as per Governor Bilbo's request. At the time of his death, he was the last living member of the first Confederate Congress and last living signer of the Confederate Constitution. He was buried at Greenwood Cemetery.

References

External links

 
 Josiah Abigail Patterson Campbell at The Political Graveyard

1830 births
1917 deaths
19th-century American politicians
19th-century jurists
Burials in Mississippi
Chief Justices of the Mississippi Supreme Court
Confederate States Army officers
Deputies and delegates to the Provisional Congress of the Confederate States
People from Camden, South Carolina
People of Mississippi in the American Civil War
Signers of the Confederate States Constitution
Signers of the Provisional Constitution of the Confederate States
19th-century American judges